Phytoecia comes is a species of beetle in the family Cerambycidae. It was described by Henry Walter Bates in 1884. It is known from Taiwan, Myanmar, North Korea, South Korea, China, Vietnam, and Japan.

Subspecies
 Phytoecia comes comes Bates, 1884
 Phytoecia comes amoena Gahan, 1894
 Phytoecia comes zetschuanica Breuning, 1967

Varietas
 Epiglenea comes var. luteodiversa Pic, 1926
 Epiglenea comes var. griseopubescens (Breuning, 1951)
 Epiglenea comes var. formosana (Schwarzer, 1925)
 Epiglenea comes var. ohbayashii Heyrovsky, 1952

References

Phytoecia
Beetles described in 1884